Clayton Parros (born December 11, 1990) is an American male track and field sprinter who specializes in the 400-meter dash. He was a runner in the gold medal-winning American 4 × 400 metres relay teams at the 2009 Pan American Junior Athletics Championships and the 2015 NACAC Championships in Athletics, setting a championship record of 3:00.07 minutes at the latter meet. He also ran as the alternate heats runner for the American teams that won gold medals at the 2014 IAAF World Indoor Championships and the 2014 IAAF World Relays.

Born in Los Angeles, California and raised in Bloomfield, New Jersey, Parros attended Seton Hall Preparatory School and University of North Carolina - Chapel Hill. He competed collegiately for the North Carolina Tar Heels and was twice Atlantic Coast Conference indoor champion over 400 m and won three ACC 4 × 400 metres relay titles.

At national level, he was runner-up in the 300-meter dash at the 2015 USA Indoor Track and Field Championships.

International competitions

References

External links
 
 

1990 births
Living people
People from Bloomfield, New Jersey
People from Los Angeles
Seton Hall Preparatory School alumni
Sportspeople from Essex County, New Jersey
Track and field athletes from New Jersey
Track and field athletes from California
American male sprinters
North Carolina Tar Heels men's track and field athletes
World Athletics Indoor Championships winners